Naval Health Research Center (NHRC) is a U.S. Department of Defense research center based out of Naval Base Point Loma in San Diego, California. The center undertakes research into operational readiness and infectious diseases. It is a subordinate command of the Naval Medical Research Center.  The center now occupies 24 former barracks buildings that have been converted into research labs on the base.

History

The center was originally formed in 1959 as the U.S. Navy Medical Neuropsychiatric Research Unit. It was refocused in 1974 to focus on the health on all naval personnel. It was later given the responsibility for all US armed forces personnel.

Research 
The NHRC undertakes research into a number of areas to increase the performance of armed forces personnel from looking at diet, sleep, environment and various other physiological factors.

The center has virtual reality suites to simulate combat environments.

References

External links 
 Official website

Medical installations of the United States Navy